La Tonya or LaTonya is a feminine African-American given name from the root name Antonius used in the United States. Notable people with this name include the following:

 La Tonya Johnson (born 1972), American politician
 LaTonya Johnson (born 1975), American basketball player
 LaTonya Sims (born 1979), American basketball player
 LaTonya Swann (born 1991), American dancer

See also

LaTanya
Latona (disambiguation)
Latonia (disambiguation)
Latoya (given name)

Notes

African-American feminine given names